Maisha Film Lab is a Uganda-based non-profit training film initiative for emerging East African filmmakers and mentor ship programme for aspiring filmmakers and youth in Eastern Africa. It encompasses film production, screenwriting, directing, producing, cinematography, editing, sound recording, and acting.

Origins 

Maisha was established in 2005 by film director Mira Nair. The name Maisha is from a Swahili word that means "life". Maisha aims to seek, identify, nurture, and promote creative talent among children and youth through hands-on skills development programmes in areas such as journalism, film-making, arts appreciation, and organisation and presentation of cultural and creative events.

Notable alumni 

Below is a list of distinguished Maisha Film Lab alumni:
Ashiq Khan
Dilman Dila
Joel Karekezi
Lupita Nyong'o
Mariam Ndagire
Rehema Nanfuka
Philbert Aime Mbabazi
Usama Mukwaya
Rehema Nanfuka
Kivu Ruhorahoza
Joel Karekezi

Sam Ishiimwe
Abdu Simba
Zippy Kimundu
Patience Katushabe Asaba

References

External links 

Film organisations in Uganda
2005 establishments in Uganda
Organizations established in 2005